Hickling Broad is a   nature reserve 4 km south-east of Stalham, north-east of Norwich in Norfolk. It is managed by the Norfolk Wildlife Trust. It is a National Nature Reserve and part of the Upper Thurne Broads and Marshes Site of Special Scientific Interest and Hickling Broad and Horsey Mere Nature Conservation Review site, Grade I. It is in the Norfolk Coast Area of Outstanding Natural Beauty, and part of the Broadland Ramsar site and Special Protection Area, and The Broads Special Area of Conservation.

It is the broad with the largest surface area, and the water is slightly brackish, due to its proximity to the sea. The navigation channel is only 1.5 m deep, with much of the broad being shallower; it is 1.4 km2, making it one of the largest expanses of open water in East Anglia.

Ecology
It has the largest reed-bed in England and supports rare waterweeds such as the holly-leaved naiad and three rare species of stonewort. Amongst the rare insects is the Swallowtail butterfly, subspecies Papilio machaon brittanicus which feeds on milk-parsley (Peucedanum palustre), the Norfolk hawker Aeshna isosceles and Emperor dragonfly. Birds that visit the reserve during the winter include cranes, common goldeneyess, shovelers and teals, while Eurasian bitterns, marsh harriers, common pochards, water rails and Cetti's warblers stay for most of the year. There is a waymarked walk around the broad.

Sea planes

Hickling Broad was used as reserve station for sea planes by the RNAS, in the period 1916–1918, as an escape for RNAS South Denes. It was known as RNAS Hickling Broads. Contractors started building a concrete slipway, but this was never completed. Eventually, Hickling was only used for two emergency landings. A separate arrangement allowed seaplanes destined for Great Yarmouth to land on the calmer waters of the broad if the sea were too rough (this arrangement stands to this day). RNAS South Denes was located in the area which is now the South Denes Camping and Caravan site. There is a commemorative Blue plaque in Regent Street in Great Yarmouth, it reads "Headquarters of the Royal Naval Air Service Occupied these premises during WWI April 1913-November 1918 Flying land & sea planes from South Denes, Hickling Broads, and heavily involved in anti Zeppelin warfare."

References

Norfolk Wildlife Trust
National nature reserves in England
Norfolk Broads
Seaplane bases in the United Kingdom
Seaplane bases in England
Hickling, Norfolk